Marvin Eriksen may refer to:

Marvin Eriksen Sr., character in How I Met Your Mother, father of Marshall Eriksen
Marvin Eriksen Jr., character in How I Met Your Mother, brother of Marshall Eriksen